Ağdam is a village and municipality in the Tovuz District of Azerbaijan. It has a population of 1,155.

Notable natives 
 Yusif Sadykhov — Hero of the Soviet Union.
 Naig Yusifov — National Hero of Azerbaijan.

References

External links

Populated places in Tovuz District